The Airspeed AS.45 Cambridge was a British advanced trainer of the Second World War built by Airspeed Limited.  It did not reach the production stage.

Development
The AS.45 was designed in response to Air Ministry Specification T.4/39 for a single-engined trainer.  It was a low-wing monoplane of composite construction with a single piston engine and a tailwheel-type, retractable undercarriage.
The first of two prototypes flew on 19 February 1941.  Testing showed deficiencies in both maximum speed and low-speed flight characteristics.

There was no attempt to rectify these shortcomings, partly because there was no shortage of advanced trainers thanks to plentiful supplies of Masters and Harvards and partly because of the importance of Airspeed's other products, the Horsa and Oxford.

Specifications (AS.45)

See also

References

Low-wing aircraft
Single-engined tractor aircraft
1940s British military trainer aircraft
Cambridge
Aircraft first flown in 1941